The Testimony of William Thorpe is a Middle English text dating from 1407. The putative author William Thorpe may have been a Lollard, a follower of John Wycliffe. Whether Thorpe ever, in fact, existed is in doubt, but the document written in his name is enticing.

The Testimony purports to record Thorpe's interrogation for heresy (or at least for information regarding Lollardy) by Thomas Arundel, Archbishop of Canterbury. The text goes beyond simply recording the events, and includes many of Thorpe's reactions to the proceedings and dialogues with Arundel. Although it suggests an impending martyrdom, the Testimony gives no clue as to Thorpe's punishment—if any.

References
 Anne Hudson, ed., Two Wycliffite Texts: The Sermon of William Taylor, 1406 -- The Testimony of William Thorpe, 1407 (Early English Text Society 301, Oxford, 1993) 

Lollards
Middle English literature
1407 works